Ioan is a variation on the name John found in Aromanian, Romanian, Bulgarian, Russian, Welsh, and Sardinian. It is usually masculine. The female equivalent in Romanian and Bulgarian is Ioana. In Russia, the name Ioann is usually reserved for the clergy (when a person called Ivan becomes a priest or a monk, he becomes known as Ioann).

People with the name

Aromanian
 Ioan Nicolidi of Pindus, physician and noble

Romanian
 Ioan-Aurel Pop, historian
 Ioan Alexandru, poet
 Ioan Andone, footballer and coach
 Ioan Apostol, luger
 Ioan Baba, poet
 Ioan A. Bassarabescu, writer and politician
 Ioan Teodor Callimachi, Prince of Moldavia
 Ioan Cantacuzino, microbiologist
 Ioan Gheorghe Caragea, Prince of Wallachia
 Ioan Carlaonț, World War II general
 Ioan Mihai Cochinescu, novelist
 Ioan Condruc, footballer
 Ioan P. Culianu, historian and philosopher
 Ioan Dumitrache, World War II general
 Ioan Fiscuteanu, actor
 Ioan Flueraș, politician
 Ioan Gherghel, swimmer
 Ioan Iacob Heraclid, Prince of Moldavia
 Ioan Holender, opera administrator
 Ioan Hora, footballer
 Ioan Hristea, World War II officer
 Ioan Igna, football referee
 Ioan Lupaș, historian and politician
 Ioan Lupescu, footballer
 Ioan Manu, politician
 I. C. Massim, linguist, founding member of the Romanian Academy
 Ioan Mirea, artist
 Ioan T. Morar, journalist
 Ioan Pălăghiță, World War II officer
 Ioan Gyuri Pascu, musician
 Ioan Mircea Pașcu, politician
 Ioan Popovici-Bănățeanul, writer
 Ioan Potcoavă, Hetman of Ukrainian Cossacks
 Ioan Pușcaș, gastroenterologist
 Ioan Mihail Racoviță, World War II general
 Ioan Rășcanu, World War I general, politician
 Ioan Sabău, footballer and coach
 Ioan Sauca, Orthodox priest, theologian, and Secretary general of the World Council of Churches
 Ioan Simu, priest and politician 
 Ioan Slavici, writer and journalist
 Ioan Sterca-Șuluțiu, Austrian noble
 Ioan Sturdza, Prince of Moldavia
 Ioan Silviu Suciu, gymnast
 Ioan Talpeș, army general and military historian
 Ioan Tănăsescu, chemist
 Ioan Tănăsescu, surgeon
 Ioan Ţepelea, scientist
 Ioan Vodă cel Cumplit, Prince of Moldavia

Bulgarian
 Ioan Vladislav, Bulgarian emperor (1015–1018)
 Ioan Asen I, Bulgarian emperor (1189–1196)
 Kaloyan, Bulgarian emperor (1197–1207)
 Ioan Asen II, Bulgarian emperor (1218–1241)
 Ioan II, Bulgarian emperor (1298-1299)
 Ioan Rilski, 9th-century Bulgarian Orthodox hermit and patron saint of Bulgaria
 Ioan Debarski, 11th-century Bulgarian clergyman and last Patriarch of the First Bulgarian Empire
 Ioan Exarch, 9th-century Bulgarian scholar, writer and translator
 Ioan Kukuzel, 14th-century Byzantine composer and singer, from Bulgarian descent
 Yoan Leviev, Bulgarian artist, painter, and creator of monumental artworks

In all Bulgarian versions of the Bible Ioan is the name used for individuals known as John in English translations, such as John the Evangelist and John the Baptist.

Welsh
In all Welsh versions of the Bible Ioan is the name used for individuals known as John in English translations, such as John the Evangelist and John the Baptist.

Welsh people called Ioan include:
 Ioan Bowen Rees, poet and mountaineer
 Ioan Cunningham, rugby coach and former player
 Ioan Davies, rugby player
 Ioan Evans (politician), politician
 Ioan Gruffudd, actor
 Ioan Lloyd, rugby player
 Ioan Nicholas, rugby player
 Ioan Tegid (John Jones), poet

Sardinian 

 Ioan Mattheu Garipa, priest and writer

English
 Ioan James, mathematician
 Ioan Grillo, journalist

Colombian
 Ioan linares, Pilot

See also
 Ion, Ionel, Ionuț, other Romanian variations
Other Welsh variations:
 Ifan (given name)
 Ieuan
 Ianto
 Siôn

References

Aromanian masculine given names
Romanian masculine given names
Welsh masculine given names